Five Ring Circus is a 1998 novel from Australian author Jon Cleary. It was the fifteenth book featuring Sydney detective Scobie Malone and involves his investigation into a financial scam in the lead up to the 2000 Sydney Olympics.

References

External links
Five Ring Circus at AustLit (subscription only)

1998 Australian novels
Novels set in Sydney
Olympic Games books
Olympic Games in fiction
HarperCollins books
William Morrow and Company books
2000 Summer Olympics
Novels by Jon Cleary